The Ghost Nebula (designated Sh2-136, VdB 141) is a reflection nebula located in the constellation Cepheus.

It lies near the cluster NGC 7023. Looking at the adjacent image, the nebula's name is easily understood. The Ghost Nebula is referred to as a globule (cataloged CB230) and over 2 light-years across. There are several stars embedded, whose emissions make the nebula shine in brownish colour.

The Ghost Nebula should not be confused with the Little Ghost Nebula (NGC 6369), the Ghost Head Nebula (NGC 2080) or the Ghost of Cassiopeia (IC 63).

References

External links
 Sky-Map.org - Sharpless Catalogue 
 NOAO 
 AAN

Reflection nebulae
Cepheus (constellation)